Panisagar is a town and a Nagar panchayat in North Tripura district in the state of Tripura, India. It is also the headquarters of Panisagar Tehsil.

Geography

It has an average elevation of 45 metres above sea level. The town is connected to Dharmanagar and Kailasahar with metalled roads. It can be accessed from the capital city of Agartala via Dharmanagar town. Panisagar is 120 km from Agartala.

Politics 

Binay Bhushan Das is the current MLA from Panisagar who won 2018 Tripura Legislative Assembly election.

Transport

National Highway 108 originates from Panisagar and extends up to Aizawl in Mizoram. The nearest airport is the Aizawl Airport which 74 km and as has a railway station called Panisagar railway station which lies on Silchar–Sabroom section. Main rail head is Silchar railway station which is 101 km from Panisagar.

Education 

 Regional College of Physical Education, Panisagar
 Kendriya Vidyalaya, Panisagar
 Holy Cross School, Panisagar
Panisagar Higher Secondary School

See also

 List of cities and towns in Tripura
 North Tripura district

References

External links 

 Government of Tripura

Cities and towns in North Tripura district